is a 2009 Japanese computer-animated film directed by Shinsuke Sato. It was produced in commemoration of Fuji Television's 50th anniversary. The film was nominated for the award for Excellent Animation of the Year at the 33rd Japan Academy Prize. The film is produced using Autodesk Maya 3D software.

Plot
After losing her mother at a young age, Haruka has treasured the hand mirror she had received from her. As she grew older, she forgot about the mirror and eventually lost it. One day, she decides to go to a local shrine and pray to Inari for the hand mirror to be returned to her. After a brief nap, she drops her house key under the steps, but when she retrieves them, a small fox/pig-like creature, takes her key. She follows the creature into the woods, and comes across a small pool with one of the eggs offered at the shrine. She dips her hand into it but is sucked through the pool and lands in a cart with the creature.

The creature, named Teo, explains to Haruka she is in the world of the neglected, made of forgotten things because his race cannot make things themselves. Haruka agrees to give him her keychain if he can help her find the mirror.  With Haruka in disguise, the two board a tram cart to the main town on Oblivion Island. After asking several vendors, Haruka discovers that the mirror has magical powers, and it was kept by the Baron, the leader of the land who hovers in an airship, but that it was stolen. A group of bullies try to remove Haruka's mask, but Teo and Haruka escape.

At a theater area where they project the memories of neglected things. Haruka recognizes her stuffed animal named Cotton, who is upset that Haruka neglected him. When the bullies bust in with a large ostrich-like contraption, Haruka grabs Cotton and they escape. At Teo's place, Haruka learns Teo wants to build a real airplane. Cotton shares that the mirror was taken by a group of underground bandits called the Petitloss. While Teo goes to get water, he is captured and delivered to the Baron, who orders him to help Haruka find the mirror but bring it to the Baron, who will neglect his crime and will also give him a huge reward of stamp cards.

Haruka, Teo and Cotton head into the lair of the Petitloss. They soon find themselves attacked by Petitloss and a large Petitloss creature. Cotton removes the threads from the large creature and Haruka finds her mirror. Although they escape the underground area, the Baron arrives to seize the mirror and to abduct Haruka. Teo is left with a pile of stamp cards but he is upset about his choice to betray his friend.

The Baron tries to make Haruka swallow an Oblivion Drop in order to remove her memories. Teo tells the townsfolk that humans are actually good. He gives away his stamp cards, and the townsfolk build him a plane, which he flies. Cotton rallies the petit-loss to raid the airship, and Haruka breaks free. The Baron activates a bunch of robots using the power of the mirror to grab Haruka, but she falls off the airship, and hangs by a banner. Cotton attacks the Baron but he rips Cotton in two and tosses it. Haruka dives after Cotton and falls, but Teo rescues her in the plane. The Baron's airship attacks the plane. It falls onto a tunnel track but they reverse it in time to get out. They crash into the airship. Teo and Haruka climb the inside and the array of the other mirrors to try to get the hand mirror. The Baron tries to stop them, but Haruka grabs the mirror and it activates. Haruka finds herself inside the mirror which shows memories of her family life; she cries. The Baron chases them out of the mirror but accidentally damages the airship, causing all his mirrors to fly around. Teo snatches the mirror as the Baron falls and the airship crashes and is destroyed. The Baron is reduced to a mask-less creature and flees. Later, Teo sends off Haruka and Cotton through the portal, where she returns to the temple and calls her dad to meet him for dinner.

Voice cast

Reception
The film was nominated for the 4th Asia Pacific Screen Award for Best Animated Feature Film. In 2010, the film won the Nippon Cinema Award at the Nippon Connection Film Festival. In 2013, it is one of the feature films of the Japanese Film festival organized by Golden Screen Cinemas in Malaysia.

Home media
The Oblivion Island: Haruka and the Magic Mirror Blu-ray was released in the US on August 14, 2012 by FUNimation Entertainment. Both the Blu-ray and DVD releases of the film were released in Japan on February 26, 2010.

Video game
A video game spin-off released for the Nintendo DS called  was developed by Climax Entertainment and published by Bandai Namco Games on August 6, 2009 exclusively in Japan.

Notes

References

External links
 Official Website 
 Official Website 
 
 

2009 anime films
2009 3D films
2009 films
2009 fantasy films
2009 science fiction films
2000s teen drama films
2009 computer-animated films
Animated films about foxes
Films directed by Shinsuke Sato
Films set in Asia
Films set in Japan
Films set in Saitama Prefecture
Funimation
2000s Japanese-language films
Japanese drama films
Japanese comedy films
Japanese fantasy films
Japanese science fiction films
Japanese teen films
Films about parallel universes
Anime and manga about parallel universes
Polygon Pictures
Production I.G
2009 drama films